Düsseldorf Airport (Bahnhof Düsseldorf Flughafen) is a railway station in Düsseldorf, Germany on the Cologne–Duisburg line that connects Düsseldorf Airport to Düsseldorf-Stadtmitte and long-distance trains, most of them ICE trains. Opened in May 2000, the new railway station has the capacity of 300 train departures per day.

History 

The federal government provided €14.6 million towards the construction of Düsseldorf Airport station. It was inaugurated on 26 May 2000, in the presence of Chancellor Gerhard Schröder and Premier of North Rhine-Westphalia, Wolfgang Clement. The station cost DM 125 million to build and went into operation on 28 May 2000.

On 1 July 2002, the SkyTrain was opened. The track is 2.5 km long and 23 m high. After the commissioning of the SkyTrain had been delayed by a year due to software problems, the train stopped operations six times in the first two weeks of public operations and was then closed to 26 August.

Current operations
Up to 300 trains stop here each day. It consists of a mainline station and an S-Bahn station, which share an entrance building. The mainline station has two platform tracks and in between there are two through tracks, running in each direction. These through tracks for trains not stopping at the station allow operations at speeds of up to 200 km/h. The S-Bahn station lies to the west of the mainline station and also has two platform tracks. The SkyTrain station is further to the west.

Train services

Long distance
The station is served by the following long-distance services (as of 2022):

Regional
In local passenger service, Düsseldorf Airport is served by several regional and S-Bahn lines (as of 2020):

References

Footnotes

Sources

External links 
 stationairport.de convention centre 
 
 
 
 360° panorama of the station

Railway stations in Düsseldorf
Rhine-Ruhr S-Bahn stations
Airport railway stations in Germany
S1 (Rhine-Ruhr S-Bahn)
Düsseldorf Airport
Railway stations in Germany opened in 2000